Ehmm Theory is a comic book series created by writer Brockton McKinney with art by Larkin Ford and published by Action Lab Comics. It is the story of Gabriel Ehmm, an unassuming young man who discovers he is linked to the access of alternative universes by blood. Together he and his talking kitten, Mr. Whispers, attempt to discover their true origins and shape the path of their future. The series is a bi-monthly ongoing and began in May 2013 to critical acclaim.

Characters
This list only includes the cast listed in the most recent issue released.
Gabriel Ehmm
Mr. Whispers

Collected editions
Ehmm Theory has been collected into the following trade paperbacks:

References

Science fiction comics
2013 in comics